"The Lighthouse Keeper" is a song by British singer Sam Smith, released through Capitol Records on 20 November 2020 as a single from their extended play, The Holly & the Ivy (2020). The song was written by Labrinth and Sam Smith. It peaked at number 72 on the UK Singles Chart.

Background
"The Lighthouse Keeper" is the second time that Smith has worked with Labrinth, he features on the title track that features on Smith's third studio album Love Goes. Labrinth also produced the song.

Composition

Written in partnership with Labrinth it is unlike anything Sam Smith has produced before. It is a throwback to the 1940s, a song with a story of Christmas reunion. The result is an unusual mix of sombre anthem and gentle lullaby, with classical-style choral backing and soft strings. The Christmas theme is subtle; the reference “home for Christmas time” doesn’t come until the end of verse two.

Music video
A music video to accompany the release of "The Lighthouse Keeper" was first released onto YouTube on 23 November 2020. The animation video was created by Babekühl. It was animated by Alexis Pepper Hernandez, Andrew Yee, Billy Ryan, Chris Yee, Eva Li, Opal Liang, Patrick Santamaria and Steffie Yee while Sam was its director.

Credits and personnel
Credits adapted from Tidal.

 Labrinth – producer, composer, lyricist, associated performer, background vocalist, electro-acoustic realisation, recording engineer, studio personnel
 Sam Smith – composer, lyricist, associated performer, vocals
 Mark Deml – assistant mixer, studio personnel
 Alison Dods – associated performer, violin
 Andy Parker – associated performer, viola
 Bruce White – associated performer, viola
 Caroline Dale – associated performer, cello
 Chris Laurence – associated performer, bass
 Chris Worsey – associated performer, cello
 David Pyatt – associated performer, French horn
 Everton Nelson – associated performer, violin
 Ian Burdge – associated performer, cello
 Ian Humphries –associated performer, violin
 Joby Burgess – associated performer, timpani
 John Metcalfe – associated performer, viola
 Louisa Fuller – associated performer, violin
 Lucy Wilkins – associated performer, violin
 Natalia Bonner – associated performer, violin
 Patrick Kiernan – associated performer, violin
 Reiad Chibah – associated performer, viola
 Richard George – associated performer, violin
 Stacey Watton – associated performer, bass
 Steve Morris – associated performer, violin
 Tony Woollard – associated performer, cello
 Warren Zielinski – associated performer, violin
 Randy Merrill – mastering engineer, studio personnel
 Steve Fitzmaurice – mixer, studio personnel

Charts

References

2020 songs
British Christmas songs
Sam Smith (singer) songs
Songs written by Sam Smith (singer)
Songs written by Labrinth
Pop ballads